Manala is a small town in the Zou Department of south-western Benin located 35 kilometres from Abomey. As of 2001 it had a population of 12,000. It covers an area of 135 km2 and the main language is French.

References

Populated places in Benin